The Ministry of Education and Merit (or MEM) is the government body of Italy devoted to the administration of the national education system.

It was active in three separate periods (1861–1929; 1944–2001; 2006–2008), before being merged with the Ministry of Universities and Research to create the Ministry of Education, University and Research.

The two ministries were re-instated in January 2020.

History
Set up in 1861 under the Cavour cabinet, it was suppressed on 12 September 1929 by Benito Mussolini's cabinet, and replaced by the Ministero dell'Educazione Nazionale (Ministry of National Education).  This name persisted until 29 May 1944 (i.e. until under the second cabinet of Pietro Badoglio), and the second Ivanoe Bonomi cabinet had it revert to its original name (della Pubblica Istruzione).

It remained unchanged until 14 December 1974, when Giovanni Spadolini (then head of government) created the Ministero per i Beni e le Attività Culturali, which took over responsibilities and functions from this and other ministries.  In 1988, the Ministero dell'Università e della Ricerca Scientifica e Tecnologica also subsumed some of the education ministry's responsibilities.  In the first Romano Prodi cabinet the two were merged into the Ministero della Pubblica Istruzione, Università, Ricerca Scientifica e Tecnologica, then the Ministero dell'istruzione, dell'università e della ricerca (MIUR) in the second and third Silvio Berlusconi cabinets.  The two were re-separated in the second Prodi cabinet of 17 May 2006, but then re-merged in the fourth Berlusconi cabinet of 7 May 2008.

Organization 
At its end in 2007, the Ministry consisted of (2007):
 Uffici per la diretta collaborazione del Ministro
 Dipartimento per l'Istruzione
 D.G. Affari internazionali
 D.G. Istruzione post-secondaria
 D.G. Ordinamenti scolastici
 D.G. Personale della scuola
 D.G. Studente
 Dipartimento per la programmazione
 D.G. Comunicazione
 D.G. Politica finanziaria e bilancio
 D.G. Risorse umane
 D.G. Sistemi informativi
 D.G. Studi e programmazione

Ministers since 1946

References

External links 
Official site
Official Forum

Education
Education
Italy
Italy, Education
Italy, Education
Italy, Education
1861 establishments in Italy